The 7.62×54mmR is a rimmed rifle cartridge developed by the Russian Empire and introduced as a service cartridge in 1891. Originally designed for the bolt-action Mosin–Nagant rifle, it was used during the late tsarist era and throughout the Soviet period to the present day. The cartridge remains one of the few standard-issue rimmed cartridges still in military use, and has one of the longest service lives of any military-issued cartridge.

The American Winchester Model 1895 was also chambered for this cartridge per a contract with the Russian government. The 7.62×54mmR is still in use by the Russian military in the Dragunov, SV-98 and other sniper rifles, as well as some modern general-purpose machine guns like the PKM and Pecheneg machine gun. Originally, the round was designated "Трехлинейный патрон образца 1891 года" – (three-line cartridge model of 1891). It then became widely known under the designation "7,62мм винтовочный патрон" (7.62 mm rifle cartridge). The round has erroneously come to be known as the "7.62mm Russian" (and is still often referred to as such colloquially), but, according to standards, the R in designation (7.62×54mmR) stands for "rimmed", in line with standard C.I.P. designations. The name is sometimes confused with the "7.62 Soviet" round, which refers to the rimless 7.62×39mm cartridge used in the SKS and AK-based (AK-47, AK-15, AEK-973) rifles.

Background
The 7.62×54mmR is the second-oldest cartridge still in regular combat service with several major armed forces in the world.  It is second to the .303 British which entered military service in 1889 and still remains in service, primarily in some Commonwealth nations around the world. In 2021, the cartridge reached 130 years in service.  the 7.62×54mmR is mainly used in designated marksman and sniper rifles like the Dragunov sniper rifle, SV-98 and machine guns like the PKM. It is also one of the few (along with the .22 Hornet, .30-30 Winchester, and .303 British) bottlenecked, rimmed centerfire rifle cartridges still in common use today. Most of the bottleneck rimmed cartridges of the late 1880s and 1890s fell into disuse by the end of the First World War.

The .30-06 Springfield cartridge (7.62×63 mm), with its higher service pressure and case capacity, will outperform the 7.62×54mmR when same-length test barrels are used, though this is very uncommon as .30-06 Springfield firearms are generally sold with much shorter barrels than 7.62×54mmR firearms. This is identical to .30-06 Springfield performance from a 24" barrel and slightly better than .30-06 Springfield performance from a 22-inch barrel.

The 7.62×54mmR originally had a 13.7 g (210 grain) "jager" round-nosed full metal jacket (FMJ) bullet. The projectile was replaced in 1908 by the  Лёгкая Пуля (Lyogkaya pulya, "light bullet") spitzer bullet, whose basic design has remained to the present. The Lyogkaya pulya, or L-bullet, had a ballistic coefficient (G1 BC) of approximately 0.338 and (G7 BC) of approximately 0.185.

Sniper rounds
To increase accuracy for the Dragunov SVD, the Soviets developed the 7N1 variant of the cartridge in 1966. The 7N1 was developed by V. M. Sabelnikov, P. P. Sazonov and V. M. Dvorianinov. It used match-grade extruded powder instead of the coarser ball propellant and had a  boat-tailed FMJ jacketed projectile with an air pocket, a steel core and a lead knocker in the base for maximum terminal effect. It had a ballistic coefficient (G1 BC) of approximately 0.411 and (G7 BC) of approximately 0.206. Produced by "Factory 188" (Novosibirsk Low Voltage Equipment Plant), cartridges are only head-stamped with the number "188" and the year of manufacture. It came packaged 20 loose rounds to a paper packet, 22 packets to a metal "spam" tin, and two tins per wooden case for a total of 880 rounds. The individual paper packets, hermetically sealed metal 'spam' cans, and wooden shipping crates were all distinctly marked Снайперская (Snaiperskaya, the adjective form of "sniper"). Even the wax wrapping paper for the paper packets was covered in red text to make sure it was not misused.

As hard body armor saw increasing use in militaries, the 7N1 was replaced in 1999 by the 7N14 special load developed for the SVD.

Cartridge dimensions
The 7.62×54mmR has 4.16 ml (64 grain H2O) cartridge case capacity. The exterior shape of the case was designed to promote reliable case feeding and extraction in bolt-action rifles and machine guns alike, under challenging conditions.

7.62×54mmR maximum C.I.P. cartridge dimensions. All sizes in millimeters (mm).

Americans would define the shoulder angle at alpha/2 ≈ 18.5 degrees. The common rifling twist rate for this cartridge is 240 mm (1 in 9.45 in), 4 grooves, Ø lands = 7.62 mm (0.300 in), Ø grooves = 7.92 mm (0.312 in), land width = 3.81 mm and the primer type is Berdan or very rarely Boxer (in large rifle size).

According to the official C.I.P. (Commission Internationale Permanente pour l'Epreuve des Armes à Feu Portatives) rulings the 7.62×54mmR can handle up to  Pmax piezo pressure. In C.I.P. regulated countries every rifle cartridge combo has to be proofed at 125% of this maximum C.I.P. pressure to certify for sale to consumers. This means that 7.62×54mmR chambered arms in C.I.P.-regulated countries are currently (2014) proof tested at  PE piezo pressure.

Performance

The attainable muzzle velocities and muzzle energies of the 7.62×54mmR are comparable with standard 7.62×51mm NATO cartridges. However, a rimmed case such as the one used in the 7.62×54mmR cartridge can complicate smooth feeding within box magazines, but they are by no means unreliable.

When used with modern hunting bullets, the 7.62×54mmR is capable of taking game in the medium- to large-sized class (CXP2 and CXP3). The 7.62×54mmR can offer very good penetrating ability due to a fast twist rate that enables it to fire long, heavy bullets with a high sectional density. In Russia, the 7.62×54mmR is commonly used for hunting purposes, mostly in sporterized Mosin–Nagant rifles and civil Dragunov variants (Tigers).

Basic specifications of 21st century Russian service loads

The 7.62×54mmR rounds in use with the Russian Armed Forces are designed for machine guns and sniper rifles. As of 2003, there were several variants of 7.62×54mmR rounds produced for various purposes. All use clad metal as case material.
57-N-323S
A conventional steel-core bullet designed to engage personnel and weapon systems. The bullet has a steel core and has a ballistic coefficient (G1 BC) of approximately 0.374 and (G7 BC) of approximately 0.187. The tip has no distinguishing colour.
7N13
An enhanced-penetration bullet designed to kill personnel wearing body armor, featuring a heat-strengthened core. The tip is uncoloured. A sealing lacquer belt on the mouth of the case is red-coloured.
7T2
A variant of the T-46, a tracer bullet designed for fire adjustment and target designation. The bullet has a green tip, and the tracer burns for 3 seconds.
7BZ3
A variant of the B-32, an armor-piercing/incendiary bullet designed to defeat lightly armored targets. The bullet has a black-red tip.
7N1
A sniper round designed for improved accuracy. The tip of the bullet is uncoloured.

Availability
7.62×54mmR is widely available both as military surplus and new production, but less so for match-grade rounds. Most surplus ammunition is steel-cased and uses Berdan primers, which effectively hinders its use for handloading. However, with the increased popularity of surplus Eastern-bloc Mosin–Nagant, SVT-40, and PSL rifles in the United States, Boxer-primed ammunition and unfired cases are increasingly available; these cases take large rifle primers.

Cartridge derivatives

USSR/Russia
 6.5×54mmR: necked-down version, used in both converted Mosin biathlon rifles and Vostok-brand biathlon rifles in the 1960s and 1970.
 9×53mmR: hunting cartridge.
 9.6×53mmR Lancaster: hunting cartridge.

Finland
 7.62×53mmR: military cartridge.
 8.2×53mmR: hunting cartridge.
 9.3×53mmR: hunting cartridge.

List of 7.62×54mmR firearms

Rifles
 3,004 Berdan II rifles were converted to 7.62×54mmR for Russian service by arms makers in Belgium.
 The various Mosin–Nagant bolt-action rifles including the sawn-off "Obrez" pistol
 The American Winchester Model 1895. Approximately 300,000 made for the Russian army in 1915–16.
 AVB-7.62
 AVS-36
 Berkut-2M1
 Dragunov sniper rifle (including Chinese NDM-86 variant)
 IZH-18MH
 JS 7.62
 Winchester 1895 (7.62x54R ver)
 M91
 PSL sniper rifle 
 Chukavin sniper rifle
 SVT-38 and SVT-40
 SV-98 (Snaiperskaya Vintovka Model 1998)
 Alejandro Sniper Rifle
 Dragunov SVU (1991 redesign of the Dragunov sniper rifle)
 Vepr sporting rifle
 MTs-13, 300m sporting rifle
 AVL, Service rifle lightweight, based on Los
 AV, Mosin based standard service rifle
 TsVR, Rekord, Rekord-1, Rekord CISM, KO-13—service rifle
 TsVT, Typhoon 300m sporting rifle
 CAVIM Catatumbo sniper rifle
 Zastava M91 sniper rifle

Machine guns
 2B-P-10
 AEK-999
 Degtyaryov machine gun (DP28)/(RP-46)
 DS-39
 GShG-7.62 machine gun
 Hua Qing Minigun
 Madsen machine gun
 MG42 (Finnish conversion efforts)
 PK machine gun (also known as PKM)
 PKP "Pecheneg" machine gun
 PM M1910
 PV-1 machine gun
 Slostin machine gun
 Savin-Narov machine gun
 SG-43 Goryunov
 ShKAS machine gun
 Type 53/57 machine gun
 Type 67 machine gun and Type 80 machine gun.
 Type 73 light machine gun
 Uk vz. 59
 Zastava M84

Alternative names

While the only official nomenclature for the cartridge is 7.62x54R ("R" standing for "rimmed"), some shooters in the U.S have confused the "R" as an abbreviation for "Russian" due to the rounds' origin.

 7.62×54R
 7.62 Russian
 7.62 Mosin–Nagant
 7.62 Dragunov
 7.62 M91
 .30 Russian
 Rimmed Russian

See also
 List of rifle cartridges
 Table of handgun and rifle cartridges
 7.62 mm caliber
 7.62×53mmR Finnish

References

Notes

Bibliography

 C.I.P. CD-ROM edition 2003
 C.I.P. decisions, texts and tables (free current C.I.P. CD-ROM version download (ZIP and RAR format))

External links

 7.62x54R rifle cartridges
 Various photos of 7.62×54mmR ammunition
 An evaluation list for variants, weights, and velocities of this ammunition type
 A dimensional diagram of the cartridge
 110 Years Of The 7.62×54R 
 C.I.P. TDCC sheet 7.62 × 54 R (indisputable legally binding dimensions and data for civilian use in Russia)

 
Pistol and rifle cartridges
Military cartridges
Weapons and ammunition introduced in 1891
Rimmed cartridges